Martina Stanley is an Irish actress known primarily for her acting work in soap opera Fair City. She plays Dolores Molloy, a former hairdresser who lives in Carrigstown.

Stanley's other acting credits include Memento Mori (1992) playing Nurse Lucy, and The Lonely Passion of Judith Hearne (1987) playing Sister Mary-Paul. As well as television and film work, Stanley is also an accomplished stage actress having appeared in a variety of plays over the past 30 years. She is known throughout Ireland and is often stopped on the street by fans seeking an autograph. Stanley has pushed her acting to the limits since she began her role in Fair City and has had viewers on the edge of their seats numerous times.

See also
 List of Fair City characters
 List of longest-serving soap opera actors#Ireland

External links

References

Year of birth missing (living people)
Living people
Irish film actresses
Irish soap opera actresses
Irish stage actresses
Irish television actresses
20th-century Irish actresses
21st-century Irish actresses